Anicetus is a Latin given name, from Greek , and may refer to:

Anicetus (freedman), 1st-century Roman commander
 Anicetus (pirate) ( 69), anti-Roman pirate
 Anicetus (wasp), genus
 Pope Anicetus ( 157–168), bishop of Rome
 Alexiares and Anicetus, minor Greek gods

See also 
 Anicet (disambiguation), French and Polish form

Latin masculine given names